Arthur Wheat may refer to:

 Arthur Wheat (footballer) (1921–1986), English footballer
 Arthur Wheat (cricketer) (1898–1973), English cricketer